Mats Moraing was the defending champion but chose not to defend his title.

Jozef Kovalík won the title after defeating Jelle Sels 7–6(8–6), 7–6(7–3) in the final.

Seeds

Draw

Finals

Top half

Bottom half

References

External links
Main draw
Qualifying draw

NÖ Open - 1